The  is an electric multiple unit (EMU) train type operated by the private railway operator Tokyu Corporation on the Tokyu Ikegami and Tokyu Tamagawa lines in Japan since 1988.

Design
Based on the earlier Tokyu 9000 series design, the 1000 series trains were built for use on through-running services to and from the Tokyo Metro Hibiya Line. Cars are 18 metres long and have three pairs of doors per side.

Operations
Three-car sets have operated on the Tokyu Ikegami Line since 1993. Four-car sets formerly operated on the Tokyu Mekama Line (present-day Tokyu Tamagawa Line and Tokyu Meguro Line), and eight-car formations formerly operated on the Tokyu Toyoko Line, with through-running to and from the Tokyo Metro Hibiya Line. The former were reformed as three-car sets, and the latter were taken out of use from 15 March 2013. From May 2014, former eight-car Tokyu Toyoko Line sets were reformed into three-car sets and refurbished for use on the Tokyu Tamagawa Line and Tokyu Meguro Line, reclassified as 1000-1500 series.

Formations

3-car sets

, the fleet consists of nine three-car sets, formed as follows, with two motored ("M") cars and one non-powered trailer ("T") car, and car 1 at the Gotanda/Tamagawa end.

Sets 1012 and 1014 have end cars with a central gangway door instead of the offset emergency gangway door on other units. These two sets were originally built as four-car sets designed to operate in pairs on Toyoko Line through services.
Cars 2 and 3 are each fitted with a single-arm pantograph.

3-car 1000-1500 series sets

The three-car 1000-1500 series sets are formed as shown below, with two motored ("M") cars and one non-powered trailer ("T") car.

 The 150x cars were converted from former 100x driving trailer cars, the 160x cars were converted from former 120x motor cars, and the 170x cars were converted from former 110x driving trailer cars.
 The 160x cars are fitted with two single-arm pantographs.
 The motor cars are mounted on TS-1006 bogies, and the trailer cars are mounted on TS-1007 bogies.

8-car sets

The eight-car sets used on the Toyoko Line up until March 2013 were formed as follows, with car 1 at the northern end.

Cars 3, 5, and 7 were each fitted with a lozenge-type pantograph. Cars 2 and 7 included wheelchair spaces.

Interior
Passenger accommodation consists of longitudinal seating throughout, with a mixture of brown and orange seat moquette. The 1000-1500 series sets formed from 2014 have light green seat moquette and a wheelchair space added in the 160x cars.

History
Initially introduced on the Tokyu Toyoko Line from 26 December 1988, they were also introduced on the Mekama Line from 1991. These were transferred to the Ikegami Line from 1992, and further new trains were built for the Ikegami Line in 1993. The last set delivered, 1024, was the first Tokyu EMU to be built with a wheelchair space. The Ikegami Line fleet underwent modifications in 1998 for use on wanman driver only operation services.

Livery variations
From March 2016, three-car set 1017 received a dark blue and yellow retro-style livery based on the livery applied to the 3450 series trains that operated on the Ikegami Line until 1989.

Withdrawal and resale
Withdrawals started in 2008, with some cars being resold to the Ueda Electric Railway and the Iga Railway. Further cars were resold to the Ichibata Electric Railway in 2014, and to Fukushima Transportation in 2017.
 Ueda Electric Railway 1000 series and 6000 series
 Iga Railway 200 series
 Ichibata Electric Railway 1000 series two-car sets (since February 2015)
 Fukushima Transportation 1000 series two- and three-car sets (since 2017)

Ueda Electric Railway
Eight former Tokyu Ikegami Line 1000 series end cars were resold to the Ueda Electric Railway in Nagano Prefecture, and reformed as four two-car 1000 series sets.

In 2015, two former Tokyu Toyoko Line 1000 series intermediate cars (DeHa 1255 and DeHa 1305) were resold to the Ueda Electric Railway, which were reformed as a two-car 6000 series set with the addition of new cab ends.

1000 series formations

6000 series formation

Car identities
The former identities of the fleet are as shown below.

Iga Railway
The Iga Railway in Mie Prefecture operates five two-car 200 series EMUs formed from ten former Tokyu 1000 series cars (from former sets 1010, 1011, and 1006) purchased between 2009 and 2012.

The two end cars from the former eight-car set reformed from two four-car sets 1010 and 1011 were resold to the Iga Railway in 2009 after the set was withdrawn. The six intermediate cars of the set were scrapped. The two intermediate driving cars (with central gangway doors) originally formed in sets 1010 and 1011 before they were combined to become a single eight-car set were also sold to Iga Railway in 2010. Following its withdrawal in June 2009, eight-car set 1006 donated six cars, which were resold to Iga Railway between 2010 and 2012. The other two cars of the set were scrapped.

Formations

Car identities
The former identities of the fleet are as shown below.

Ichibata Electric Railway
In 2014, four former 1000 series intermediate cars (1453, 1403, 1455, and 1405) were resold to the Ichibata Electric Railway in Shimane Prefecture, which were reformed as two-car 1000 series sets with the addition of new cab ends. These entered service on 9 February 2015.

Formations

Car identities
The former identities of the fleet are as shown below.

Fukushima Transportation

In 2017, a number of former 1000 series cars were resold to Fukushima Transportation in Fukushima Prefecture for use on the Fukushima Kōtsū Iizaka Line. Classified as 1000 series, the trains are formed as two- and three-car sets as follows. Two sets (one two-car and one three-car set) were converted in fiscal 2016, entering service on 1 April 2017. Two more sets (one two-car and one three-car set) are scheduled to be introduced during fiscal 2017, followed by two more two-car sets in fiscal 2018, ultimately replacing the entire fleet of 7000 trainsets.

Two-car sets

Three-car sets

Car identities
The former identities of the fleet are as shown below.

References

Electric multiple units of Japan
1000 series
Train-related introductions in 1988
1500 V DC multiple units of Japan
Tokyu Car multiple units